Nathan "Nat" Bor (March 1, 1913 – June 13, 1972) was an American boxer who won a light weight bronze medal at the 1932 Summer Olympics.  He continued primarily a professional welterweight boxing career until around 1940, when he served as a Marine in WWII, before returning to start a dry cleaning business in his home of Fall River, Massachusetts.

Personal
Bor was Jewish, and of Russian heritage. He was born in Fall River, Massachusetts on March 1, 1913.

Amateur career
As an amateur, Bor won 90 of 95 bouts, taking both the New England and then the National lightweight championships.  During his amateur career, he sidelined as a telephone operator in his home of Fall River.

As the 1932 United States Amateur Lightweight Champion, he was sent to the Los Angeles Olympics and received the Olympic bronze medal in the lightweight class after winning the third place fight against Mario Bianchini on August 13.  Bor was coached by the talented Spike Webb, the American team boxing coach at the 1932 Olympics, who spent much of his later career training the nearly undefeated teams of the US Naval Academy in Annapolis.

August 1932 Olympic results
 Quarterfinal: defeated Harry Mizler, future British light champ, in three rounds on points
 Semifinal: lost to Thure Ahlqvist (Sweden) on points in 3 rounds.  According to one local source, Bor took a lead in the second round with strong blows to the head, but in the third and final round pulled up too often in clinches and lost from longer left and rights to the head from his taller Swedish opponent.
 Bronze Medal Bout: defeated Mario Bianchini (Italy) on points for third place.

Professional career
Bor won his first professional bout with a second-round knockout of Al Hope on October 5, 1932 at the Casino in his home of Fall River, Massachusetts.  The win was followed by a streak of wins that lasted four years and included nearly 28 fights.

In a disappointing turn that ended Bor's long early career winning streak, he lost to the somewhat heavier, more experienced, and likely more talented Babe Marino on October 21, 1936 in a widely anticipated eight round main event at the Auditorium in Oakland.  Due to the bout's potential importance and Bor's successful record, he was trained by two well known former contenders, Jimmy Duffy and ex-light heavy champ Tommy Loughran.  Before a substantial crowd of 4,000, Bor lost decisively, beginning in the second round when Marino began crowding him, and Bor could only land the occasional right hand to the chin which did little damage compared to the constant barrage he received from Marino.  Marino was given every round but the sixth by the judges.  The loss hurt Bor's chances of progressing to a title shot.

Bobby Allen fell to Bor on April 12, 1937 in a ten-round points decision in Holyoke, Massachusetts.  Winning in an upset, Bor floored his rival with a lethal uppercut to the chin in the tenth round.

On June 24, 1937, he lost a ninth-round technical knockout to Andy Callahan at Brave's Field in Boston.  Early in the bout, Bor suffered a bad cut over his left eye, which grew worse until the referee stopped the fighting 1:05 into the ninth round.  Though there were no knockdowns in the bout, Callahan managed to earn a large lead on points from the opening rounds.

Bor lost to Frankie Britt, a former New England Lightweight champion, on October 6, 1938, at the Fall River Casino in a twelve-round unanimous decision.

He defeated K.O. Castillo on October 28, 1938, in a ten-round newspaper decision in Portland, Oregon.  The Boston Globe gave Bor nine of the ten rounds.

His last bout on May 24, 1940, was an eighth-round technical knockout loss to Joe Boscarino in Boston Garden.

Life after boxing
Bor joined the Marines during World War II and served as a boxing coach stationed at Paris Island, the well known Marine base in Southeastern South Carolina.  After the war, he returned to Massachusetts where he first worked as a foreman at the Eastern Sportswear Manufacturing Company and then opened the Olympic Dry Cleaners in 1948 in his hometown of New Bedford.  He died on June 13, 1972 in New Bedford, Massachusetts, after suffering a heart attack while on his dry cleaning route, leaving a wife, Leona, and two children. A memorial service was held at Fall River's Fisher Memorial Chapel.

Selected fights

|-
| align="center" colspan=8|7 Wins, 4 Losses
|-
| align="center" style="border-style: none none solid solid; background: #e3e3e3"|Result
| align="center" style="border-style: none none solid solid; background: #e3e3e3"|Opponent(s)
| align="center" style="border-style: none none solid solid; background: #e3e3e3"|Date
| align="center" style="border-style: none none solid solid; background: #e3e3e3"|Location
| align="center" style="border-style: none none solid solid; background: #e3e3e3"|Duration
| align="center" style="border-style: none none solid solid; background: #e3e3e3"|Notes
|-
| Win
| Harry Mizler
| Aug 9, 1932
| Los Angeles
| 3 Rounds
| 1932 Olympic win
|-
| Loss
| Thure Ahlqvist
| Aug 12, 1932
| Los Angeles
| 3 Rounds
| 1932 Olympic loss
|-
| Win
| Mario Bianchini
| Aug 13, 1932
| Los Angeles
| 3 Rounds 
| Won Olympic Bronze
|-
| Win
| Al Hope
| Oct 5, 1932
| Fall River, MA
| 2nd Round KO 
| 
|-
| Win
| Babe Marino
| Oct 21, 1936
| Oakland California
| 8 Rounds 
| Broke a long streak of 28 wins
|-
| Win
| Bobby Allen
| Apr 12, 1937
| Holyoke, MA
| 10 Rounds 
| Upset
|-
| Win
| Joe Gelinas 
| May 31, 1937
| Holyoke, MA
| 3rd Round TKO
| Gelinas down 5 times
|-
| Loss
| Andy Callahan
| June 24, 1937
| Braves Field, Boston
| 9th Round KO 
| Bor suffered bad cut,  over left eye
|-
| Loss
| Frankie Britt
| Oct 6, 1938
| Fall River, MA
| 12 Round UD
| Former New England light champ
|-
| Win
| K. O. Castillo
| Oct 28, 1938
| Portland
| 10 Rounds 
| Newspaper Decision 
|-
| Loss
| Joe Boscarino
| May 24, 1940
| Boston Garden
| 8th Round TKO 
|

See also
 List of select Jewish boxers

References

External links
 
 
 

1913 births
1972 deaths
Sportspeople from Fall River, Massachusetts
Jewish boxers
Jewish American boxers
American people of Russian-Jewish descent
Boxers from Massachusetts
Lightweight boxers
Boxers at the 1932 Summer Olympics
Olympic bronze medalists for the United States in boxing
American male boxers
Medalists at the 1932 Summer Olympics
Jewish American military personnel
20th-century American Jews